Craig Sorrell Pittman (born September 6, 1956) was a judge of the Alabama Court of Civil Appeals from 2001 until his retirement at the end of his most recent term on January 11, 2019.

Early life and education

Pittman was born on September 6, 1956, in Enterprise, Alabama. He graduated from  Middlebury College in Vermont, where he received his Bachelor of Arts degree in Political Science with honors in 1978. In 1981 he was awarded a Juris Doctor degree from the Cumberland School of Law. He was admitted to the practice of law in the State of Alabama in 1981 and in the State of Florida in 1982.

Legal career
After graduating from law school Pittman clerked for Judge Thomas Virgil Pittman of the United States District Court for the Southern District of Alabama from 1981 to 1983. He then practiced law in Mobile with the law firm of Hamilton, Butler, Riddick, Tarlton and Sullivan from 1983 to 1986. In 1986 he started his own firm which eventually became known as Pittman, Pittman, Carwie and Fuquay. He has served as a Deputy Attorney General and General Counsel for the Alabama State Docks.

Service on Alabama Court of Civil Appeals
He was first elected in November 2000. He was re-elected in 2006 and 2012 and retired at the end of his term on January 13, 2019, having not sought re-nomination in the June 2018 primary.

Personal life
Pittman is married to Janet Rich Pittman of Mobile. He has two children.

He is a registered Republican.

References

External links

Mobile Bar Association profile

1956 births
Living people
Alabama lawyers
Alabama Republicans
Alabama state court judges
Cumberland School of Law alumni
Middlebury College alumni
People from Enterprise, Alabama
20th-century American lawyers
21st-century American judges